Miconia bailloniana is a species of plant in the family Melastomataceae. It is endemic to Peru & Bolivia.

References

 Revista peruana de Biología 

Flora of Peru
Flora of Bolivia
bailloniana
Near threatened plants
Taxonomy articles created by Polbot